The Kreis Kolmar in Posen (1818–1877 Kreis Chodziesen) was a district in the northern government region of Bromberg, in the Prussian Province of Posen, from 1818 to 1920. The district capital was Kolmar in Posen.

History
The district of Chodziesen was formed in 1818. It became part of the German Empire in 1871. On March 6, 1877, the district and the district town of Chodziesen were renamed Kolmar in Posen. On 1 April 1914 the city of Schneidemühl was disentangled from the district and became an independent town (Stadtkreis) within the Bromberg Region.

On December 27, 1918, the Greater Poland uprising began in the province of Posen. Except for the south of the district around the town of Budsin, the Kolmar district remained largely under German control. On February 16, 1919, an armistice ended the Polish-German fighting. On June 28, 1919, with the signing of the Treaty of Versailles, the German government officially ceded most of the district including the capital Kolmar to the newly founded Second Polish Republic.

On November 25, 1919, Germany and Poland concluded an agreement on the evacuation and surrender of the areas to be ceded, which was ratified on January 10, 1920. The area to be ceded was cleared and handed over to Poland between January 17 and February 4, 1920.

Only the rural communities of Schönfeld, Stöwen and Usch Hauland in the northern part of the Kolmar district remained in Germany after this, as did the city of Schneidemühl. These areas became part of the newly formed Prussian Province of Grenzmark Posen-West Prussia. Schönfeld became part of the Flatow district, while Stöwen and Usch Hauland became part of the newly formed Netzekreis district.

Demographics 
According to the census of 1858, the district had a population of 49,380, of which 39,087 (79%) were Germans and 10,293 (21%) were Poles.

Table of Standesämter 
"Standesamt" is the German name of the local civil registration offices which were established in October 1874 soon after the German Empire was formed. Births, marriages and deaths were recorded. Previously, only the church records were used for Christians.

Military command 
Kreis Kolmar was part of the military command (German: Bezirkskommando) at Schneidemühl, which was the garrison of the 149th Infanterie regiment (6th Westpreußisches) of the 74. Inf. Brigade. Created Mar 31, 1897. Also, since 1913, the home of the 5th Luftschiffer- Bataillon (Zeppelins).

Court system 
The main court (German: Landgericht) was in Schneidemühl, with subject courts (German: Amtsgericht) in the district capital Kolmar in Posen and Margonin.

Police districts
Police districts (German: Polizeidistrikt) were administered from the towns of Budsin, Kolmar, Samotschin, Schneidemühl and Usch.

References 

This article is part of the project Wikipedia:WikiProject Prussian Kreise. Please refer to the project page, before making changes.

Districts of the Province of Posen